Helpaphorus imaitso is a moth of the family Pterophoridae. It is known from Madagascar.

The larvae feed on Helichrysum triplinerve.

References

External links
 

Oidaematophorini
Moths of Madagascar
Moths of Africa
Moths described in 1994